The Matron Stakes is an American Grade III flat horse race for Thoroughbred fillies and mares, aged three years and upward.  Raced over a distance of 9 furlongs on the dirt at Arlington Park, Arlington Heights, Illinois every spring. It currently offers a purse of $100,000.

The event was moved to Churchill Downs in 2017.

Inaugurated in 1930, Hall of Fame member, Bewitch, ran second in 1949.  Real Delight won it in 1953.

Recent winners

 1947 – But Why Not
 1949 – Lithe
 1957 – Pucker Up
 2005 – Indy Groove (Charles Woods)
 2006 – Sea Siren
 2007 – Solo Survivor
 2008 – Indescribable (Jeremy Rose)
 2009 – Euphony (Cliff Berry)
 2010 – Tizaqueena (E. T. Baird)
 2011 – Pachattack (Florent Geroux)
 2012 – Upperline (James Graham)
 2013 – Imposing Grace (João Moreira)
 2014 – La Tia (E. T. Baird)
 2015 – Race not held
 2016 – Flipcup (Christopher A. Emigh)
 2017 – Walkabout
 2018 – Princess La Quinta
 2019 – Coachwhip

References

Graded stakes races in the United States
1930 establishments in Illinois
Mile category horse races for fillies and mares
Recurring sporting events established in 1930
Arlington Park
Horse races in Illinois